Corematura is a genus of moths in the subfamily Arctiinae. The genus was erected by Arthur Gardiner Butler in 1876.

Species
 Corematura aliaria (Druce, 1890)
 Corematura chrysogastra Perty, 1834

References

External links

Arctiinae